Farjam Behnam (born in 1966 in Tehran, Iran) is an editor, researcher and founder of Iran Almanac.

He joined The Echo of Iran in 1998 and started his work as an editor and translator. In 2000 he started his own company and website, which is still online.

Selected to be a delegate for the UNHCR Refugee Congress in Washington D.C.   As a delegate, Mr. Behnam represents resettled refugees in the state of Virginia.

Publications
 Editor of Iran Almanac and The book of facts 2003 & 2007 - 2008.
 Editor and translator of Iran Who's Who 2000, 2003, 2006 & 2008.
 Translator and one of the contributors in The Echo of Iran Monthly published Political Bulletin, published in Iran and U.K.
 Editor and publisher of Iran Almanac monthly published political bulletin on Iran.
 Reports news for Iran-e Farda TV, news based in the UK
 Refugee Congress Delegate of Virginia, USA (UNHCR)

References

Sources 
 adinebook.com
 npec-web.org
 
 http://www.unicef.org/Iran/IRN_resources_Printed_E-library_eng.xls 
 http://www.theisraelproject.org/atf/cf/...741E.../POLICYFOCUS84.PDF
 http://www.ketab.ir/DesktopDefault.aspx?TabID=3567
 http://www.zanschool.org/English/spip.php?article107&debut...15
 http://www.ir/glossaries/instance.php?id=345625&gid=4
 http://www.njscvva.org/.../2008%2006%2015%20-%20Consequences%20of%20Preventive%20Military%20Action%20
 http://www.worldcat.org/oclc/1039995
 http://www.ir/profile.aspx?id=4064
 http://www.iranalmanac.com
 http://www.ketab.ir/DesktopDefault.aspx?TabID=3564
 http://www.isbn.ir/DesktopDefault.aspx?TabID=3564&Site...fa
 http://www.alimama.com/alexa/iranalmanac.com/
 http://www.iranalmanac.com/who/biography.php?id=216 
 http://www.adinebook.com/gp/product/9649383360

External links
 Iran Almanac

Living people
1966 births
Iranian editors